Manzanouan is a village in eastern Ivory Coast. It is in the sub-prefecture of Akoboissué, Agnibilékrou Department, Indénié-Djuablin Region, Comoé District. Six kilometres east of the village is a border crossing with Ghana.

Manzanouan was a commune until March 2012, when it became one of 1126 communes nationwide that were abolished.

Notes

Former communes of Ivory Coast
Populated places in Comoé District
Ghana–Ivory Coast border crossings
Populated places in Indénié-Djuablin